The following characters had significant roles in the American television comedy series Malcolm in the Middle, which was originally televised from 2000 to 2006 on the Fox Network.

Characters 

Originally, the series featured four brothers, although Malcolm's oldest brother attended a military school away from home, so Malcolm was still the middle sibling left at home. A fifth son named Jamie was introduced in the show's fourth season. The boys are, from eldest to youngest: Francis, Reese, Malcolm, Dewey, and Jamie. In the final episode, Lois discovered she was pregnant with a sixth child. In the third season, Francis travels home (to celebrate his father's birthday) with an Alaskan Piama, and reveals that they are married.

During the show, the family's name was kept a secret. In the fifth-season episode "Reese Joins the Army (1)", Reese uses a fake ID by the name of "Jetson" to lie about his age. In the series finale, "Graduation", Francis' employee ID reads "Nolastname" (or "No Last Name", a joke referring to the fact that the family name was never spoken aloud). In the same episode when Malcolm was introduced to give the graduation speech, the speaker announces Malcolm's name, but microphone feedback makes his surname inaudible, even though he does appear to mouth the phrase "No last name".

The DVD insert from series five shows the family surname as "Wilkerson" in the description of the episode, Block Party. This last name is confirmed in Pilot, Dinner Out and Company Picnic Pt. 1.

Character appearances

Main

Malcolm 
Malcolm, played by Frankie Muniz (150 episodes), is the main protagonist and occasional narrator of the series. He is about five years younger than his oldest brother Francis, one year younger than his older brother Reese, five years older than his younger brother Dewey, and about 15 years older than his youngest brother Jamie. In the first episode of the series, he is discovered to be a child prodigy and immediately moved from his regular class into the "Krelboynes", a class for gifted students. Despite his high intelligence, he still gets into mischief either alongside or working against his brothers (in particular, Reese), although he becomes more self-centered and vain in the later seasons as he goes through puberty. Being a genius, Malcom often serves as the ring leader in the brother’s juvenile schemes. According to Hal, in "Stock Car Races" (season 1), Malcolm was named after Hal's favorite Stock Car Racer, Rusty Malcolm, although he had previously argued with Lois about giving the name to Francis and Reese. Malcolm, like Reese, is very unpopular at school, yet he has had a number of girlfriends during the series run. Like Lois, he gets angry or frustrated very easily but he also has problems containing his opinion about himself. Malcolm also occasionally serves as the voice of reason, and does have a conscience, for instance, despite emotionally manipulating a grieving Hal to buy him a car in the episode "Hal Grieves," when the time comes to make the purchase he finds he can't go through with it. In the series finale, it is revealed that Lois intended him to have a hard life, knowing that he is destined to assume the role of President of the United States; she wants him to remember where he came from to get there and help families like his own when he assumes the office. Malcolm eventually comes to terms with his future, after being unable to tell Lois he cannot do it. In the series finale, he begins taking classes at Harvard University. Throughout the series, Malcolm frequently breaks the fourth wall and talks to the viewer about either the current situation or giving exposition about past events.

Reese 
Reese, played by Justin Berfield (151 episodes), is the second-oldest of the brothers. He is about three years younger than his brother Francis, one year older than his brother Malcolm, six years older than his brother Dewey, and about 16 years older than his youngest brother Jamie. It was revealed in the episode "Flashback", in season 2, that Reese has been vicious from the womb, so vicious in fact that when he kept kicking Lois during labor, she pushed him out by force. In Clip Show #2, he is revealed to have directly caused Lois' Staph Infection due to his uncontrollable kicking in her womb. Reese is the worst-behaved of the brothers and generally feels little to no empathy towards those he torments. Reese is the most frequently punished of his brothers to the point where he treats being grounded by Lois as an everyday occurrence. At the beginning of the series, Reese is the school’s top bully and is often inclined to beat up the Krelboynes except Stevie who is off-limits because he is in a wheelchair. Despite his infamous reputation as a bully, Reese has at times been shown to be intimidated or afraid of people who are stronger than him. Considered to be the least intelligent of his brothers, Reese is not academically gifted and often has the Krelboynes do his schoolwork for him. Despite this, Reese is actually a culinary prodigy, after finding that he has a talent and genuine love for cooking and baking to the point where he is put in charge of cooking for holidays and special events. He is also considered by others to be an evil genius when it comes to bullying, tormenting, blackmailing and beating up others for his own satisfaction. He is the favorite grandson of his grandmother Ida, who taught him the importance of having patsies. In the series finale, Reese moves in with Craig Feldspar and is a janitor at his alma mater North High.

Dewey 
Dewey, played by Erik Per Sullivan (151 episodes), is portrayed as being quieter, more innocent brother but becomes just as spiteful and destructive as his older siblings as the series progressed. Initially the youngest brother, Dewey is regularly bullied by both Malcom and Reese for years to the point where he becomes completely immune to their torture methods. He is also frequently underestimated by his brothers to the point where they sometimes find themselves at his mercy. Despite this, he partakes in many of the brother’s juvenile schemes and is just as spiteful and vindictive as they are. Dewey is more inclined to the arts than his brothers. He soon finds he is a musical prodigy, and as the series goes on he becomes more caring and thoughtful especially in regards to his younger brother Jamie, whom he decides not to bully like he was by Malcolm and Reese. Lois remarks at one point that unlike Malcolm, who would have to work hard to achieve success, Dewey would have success handed to him. Dewey joins the Buseys, a class for the emotionally disturbed, by mistake and ends up becoming their unofficial teacher. He ended up caring for his fellow students so much that, when the mistake was uncovered, he feigned severe emotional problems so he could remain. In the final few seasons, Dewey becomes increasingly bitter towards his parents due to them overlooking him throughout his childhood and neglecting his interests. Because of this, he forces them to give Jamie the childhood he never had. In the last episode, he and Jamie (the only other remaining brother living at home) continued the tradition of causing havoc all over the house.

Lois 
Lois, played by Jane Kaczmarek (146 episodes), is Francis, Reese, Malcolm, Dewey, and Jamie's temperamental and overbearing mother. She is despised by the neighbors to the point that they refuse to invite her to their gatherings, revealed in "Mono". Unlike Malcolm, Lois is not bothered by it and tries her best to blend in with it. Lois is 38 years old as of Season 2, and had originally planned to attend music school and become a concert violinist before she married Hal ("Lois' Birthday"). She was revealed to be a charming and nurturing mother while Francis was little, but toughened up. When she became more overbearing and demanding, it did not help Francis or the other boys to behave, but she unknowingly made it worse. She also stubbornly believes she is always in the right, to the point of being unable to say that she was wrong. Lois's severe anger issues are very often caused by her sons' frequent bad behavior, and also from a miserable childhood, living with uncaring parents Ida and Victor, both of whom favored her younger sister, Susan. Lois and Susan would later have a serious falling out after it is revealed that Hal was originally Susan's boyfriend. She is a pushy academic mother and in the series finale, it is revealed that she is trying to groom Malcolm to become President of the United States. The finale also reveals that she is pregnant again. Lois is usually seen driving the family's early 1990s Dodge Grand Caravan.

Hal 
Hal, played by Bryan Cranston (151 episodes), is the father of the family. Though relaxed in his parenting when compared to Lois, Hal has shown that he can slide into a disciplinarian when confronted by the boys' bad behavior. He used to be like his sons, especially Francis, until he married Lois and she nurtured him. He comes from a wealthy family who resent his choice to marry Lois over Susan (an action also shared by Victor and Ida). Hal has a hard time making good decisions, which he often deferred to Lois. Despite the fact many of the neighbors hate his family and especially Lois, Hal blends in well with them. He loves Lois more than she loves him, never even thinking about other women. He is also very scared of her, even more than the boys are, which is why he often bribes their sons to take the fall for his wrongdoings. He is very devoted to Lois and willing to give the boys punishment they deserve that Lois gives them. Lois is usually head of the household and Hal is second-in-command. He is very neurotic and has a slight obsessive-compulsive disorder, and also enjoys unusual hobbies. Briefs are his underpants of choice. Hal is also a sex addict, as revealed in the episode "Poker 2" when Hal tells his friends he has sex 14 times per week. It is mentioned again in the episode "Forbidden Girlfriend" when Lois is taking medication and is unable to have sex for an entire week, and Hal has a hard time coping with this. It was also revealed that Hal was a chain smoker before quitting the habit. Hal's best friend is Abe Kenarban. Hal works in a lower management job in a corporation that he always hated. He used to be an executive and got demoted when he mouths off to his boss in the season 2 finale. Hal is usually seen driving a late 1980s to early 1990s Dodge Dynasty.

Francis 
Francis, played by Christopher Kennedy Masterson (118 episodes), is the oldest of the brothers, whom Malcolm often looks up to. According to the season 1 episodes "Sleepover" and "The Bots and the Bees", Francis was a breech birth. The season 2 episode "Flashback" reveals that Lois was in labor with him during her and Hal's wedding. A rebel from birth, showing signs of attention deficit hyperactivity disorder and conduct disorder, Francis was exiled to the Marlin Academy military school by Lois for his behavior. By season 3, he emancipates himself to run away from the academy to work in Alaska, incurring his mother's wrath. Shortly after moving to Alaska, he marries a local woman about one year older than him named Piama, who had a previous brief marriage, though Lois disapproves of Francis marrying her. During the fourth and fifth season, Francis works at a dude ranch owned by Otto Mannkusser and his wife Gretchen. Francis is mostly absent for the last two seasons, but, in the series finale, Hal discovers that he has taken a job with Amerysis Industries, a large corporation where Francis works in a cubicle and inputs numbers into a computer, and is also still happily married to Piama. Although Francis enjoys the job, he refuses to tell Lois about it, as he enjoys torturing her by telling her that he is still unemployed.

Caroline Miller 
Caroline Miller, played by Catherine Lloyd Burns (15 episodes), is the primary teacher of Malcolm's "Krelboyne" class in the first two seasons. She is shown to be overly-earnest as well as to adore Malcolm. In season 1, she is included as part of the main cast, but in season 2, is a recurring character. In season 2, she is shown to be pregnant until she gives birth to her baby in the parking lot. After her baby was born, she quit teaching. She was never seen or mentioned again after season 2.

Recurring characters

The Kenarbans 
Stevie Kenarban, played by Craig Lamar Traylor (56 episodes), is Malcolm's best friend and classmate. He is a paraplegic, asthmatic and was born with one lung, requiring him to speak slowly and take deep breaths in between words. Though Malcolm is initially upset when Lois arranges a "playdate" for him and Stevie in the pilot episode, the boys immediately find common ground, particularly their love of comic books, and become friends. His parents are very overprotective of him, although Stevie displays in many episodes that he lives very comfortably with his disability and even has a dark sense of humor about it.
Abe Kenarban, played by Gary Anthony Williams (19 episodes), is Stevie's father and Kitty's husband, and a close family friend of both Lois and particularly Hal. Abe is initially depicted as cowardly and dependent on Kitty's guidance (which he attributes to his upbringing, having been raised by his grandmother and four spinster aunts). However he ultimately becomes more self-reliant after Kitty's departure. Despite this, Abe is more than willing to take Kitty back after her return, going as far as to harbor resentment towards Lois after she criticized Kitty's decision to leave.
Kitty Kenarban, played by Merrin Dungey (5 episodes), is Stevie's mother and Abe's wife. Because of Dungey's commitment to the ABC series Alias, Kitty remains unseen for much of the series, apparently due to her abandoning her husband and son, which briefly throws Stevie into a deep depression. She returns once in the season 6 episode "Kitty's Back".

Krelboynes 

Lionel Herkabe, played by Chris Eigeman (9 episodes), is the central antagonist of the series. He was first introduced in season 3 as the Krelboynes' teacher after Caroline leaves. A Krelboyne himself in middle school, he was forced into a teaching career after losing his millions in a failed dot-com company. He is portrayed as a malevolent, cynical, and conniving man who thrives on psychological warfare and making his students suffer. Malcolm especially is a threat to him and quickly becomes his nemesis at school, even blackmailing North High's principal, Block (before Hodges took over), into hiring him as vice principal when Malcolm enrolls there. Mr. Herkabe also intensely enjoys humiliating Reese to antagonize Malcolm more. However, Herkabe's arrogance in confessing that he skipped gym class in his senior year of high school and lied about not taking the course is brought to light, leading to Mr. Hodges revoking his GPA Award in the season 7 episode "Malcolm Defends Reese". He is last seen when Reese tosses dodgeballs at him in P.E. class as an attempt to reclaim his title.
Cynthia Sanders, played by Tania Raymonde (4 episodes), is one of Malcolm's classmates. She has a very extensive vocabulary, but has a difficult time making friends. Depicted as relatively cheerful, Cynthia becomes one of Malcolm's earliest crushes on the show, although a relationship never develops.
Lloyd Jensen, played by Evan Matthew Cohen (25 episodes), is one of Malcolm's "Krelboyne" classmates who recurs throughout the series. He frequently worries about random small things, gets hurt, and falls victim to bullies. 
Dabney Hooper, played by Kyle Sullivan (24 episodes), is one of Malcolm's "Krelboyne" classmates who recurs throughout the series. Often depicted as the weakest and most cowardly of the group, his overbearing mother almost completely controls his life until his last appearance, in which using paintball as an outlet for his anger towards his mother results in him immediately developing a tougher, if still somewhat socially awkward persona.
Flora Mayesh, played by Kristin Quick (15 episodes), is one of Malcolm's other "Krelboyne" classmates. As a background character, Flora rarely speaks and is uncredited for 12 of her appearances.
"Eraserhead" (real name: Kyle), played by Will Jennings (12 episodes), is one of Malcolm's "Krelboyne" classmates who recurs throughout early episodes of the series.
Kevin, played by Victor Z. Isaac (5 episodes), is one of Malcolm's "Krelboyne" classmates who recurs throughout later episodes of the series.

Family members 
Piama Tananahaakna, played by Emy Coligado (29 episodes), is Francis' wife whom he meets and marries off-screen during his year in Alaska. Piama was born on an Alaska Native reservation, is about a year older than Francis, and was married once before meeting him.  Primarily due to her being brought home under volatile circumstances, in which Francis (while still a minor, although emancipated) shocks the family with news of the marriage and thus disrupting Hal's birthday party, Lois dislikes Piama from her introduction in the third season and into the fourth. However, after an embarrassing encounter with her wealthy in-laws, Lois starts to respect Piama more. Piama is against having children until the series finale, when one of Reese's pranks goes awry.
Victor Welker and Ida Kenzel-Welker, played by Robert Loggia (1 episode) and Cloris Leachman (11 episodes) respectively, are Lois' parents. Victor dies some time before the events of the season three episode "Christmas", in which Ida is widowed. Ida harbors a strong dislike for both Francis and Lois, evident by the way she treats them. She favors Reese, which allows him to love her. Ida belittles Malcolm for being weak in not standing up to his mother and largely ignores Dewey, although she saves him from being hit by a car, causing her to lose a leg. Ida harbors resentment towards Victor's secret other family for stealing what was rightfully hers, until Lois discovers near the end of the fifth season that she is not blood-related to Victor (and possibly Susan as well) and abandons Ida. Ida had a sister, Helen, whose funeral is featured in the first season.
Susan Welker, played by Laurie Metcalf (1 episode), is Lois' younger sister who is often mentioned throughout the series and makes her first appearance in the episode "Lois' Sister" of season 5. Susan is regarded as more talented, popular, and successful, as well as the family favorite. Susan dated Hal before Lois did and blames her sister for stealing him, leading to their rivalry. When Lois learns she is in Kidney failure, she decides to donate one of her kidneys to save her life, which Susan rejects until Lois persuades her otherwise. Susan is briefly mentioned in seasons 6 and 7, but not seen again.
Raduca, played by Rheagan Wallace, is Reese's wife for two episodes during season 7, chosen by Ida. During their short-lived marriage, Raduca has an affair with another man throughout.
Jamie, played by identical twin brothers James and Lukas Rodriguez (35 episodes), is the youngest child born to Hal and Lois. He is the only brother who beats Lois in her own game, bordering to attacking her (though Reese is mostly responsible for feeding him soda). Like Malcolm and Dewey, Jamie is intelligent, as evidenced when he tricks Reese into taking a marker after coloring part of a wall.
Walter, played by Christopher Lloyd (1 episode), is Hal's wealthy father and a retired military veteran, who along with his unseen wife Sharon wanted Hal to marry a wealthy woman rather than Lois. He has a habit of not listening to Hal voicing his problems from childhood to the present because he isn't sure how to deal with them, as his other children did not experience the same problems growing up. Walter takes a liking to Malcolm more than his other grandsons because of their shared love of history, and he is particularly passionate about the American Civil War. He dies offscreen in the season 7 episode "Hal Grieves."
Amelia and Claire, played by Brenda Strong and Jeannine Jackson respectively (1 episode), are Hal's older sisters, who dislike Lois and swap passive-aggressive comments with her. Despite her similar poor background, it was implied that Amelia and Claire liked Susan more than Lois.

Friends and neighbors 
Craig Feldspar, portrayed by David Anthony Higgins (39 episodes), is Lois' cowardly, somewhat childish co-worker at the Lucky Aide, who is promoted to assistant manager early on. He is a hopeless romantic, and has unrequited feelings for Lois. He plays the ukulele and the banjo, and he sings in a countertenor voice. He is also very knowledgeable about home entertainment systems, computers and old TV shows. By the end of the series, Craig becomes Reese's roommate.
Malik, Trey, Brian, and Steve, played by Dan Martin, Alex Morris, Edward James Gage, and Jonathan Craig Williams, respectively (7 episodes), are Hal and Abe's poker buddies and fellow a cappella band-mates. 
Jessica, played by Hayden Panettiere (4 episodes), is a manipulative neighbor of the family and a classmate of Malcolm and Reese's.
Ed, played by Paul Willson (5 episodes), is one of the many neighbors who despises Hal and Lois, along with Reese. He has shown some favoritism towards Malcolm for helping him set up his new computer.
Polly, played by Julie Hagerty (4 episodes), is Jamie's slightly insane hippie babysitter.
Karen, played by Amy Farrington (2 episodes), is Lois' alcoholic and airheaded friend from the book club.

Marlin Academy 
Commandant Edwin Spangler, played by Daniel von Bargen (16 episodes), is the military veteran in charge of the cadets at Marlin Academy. A retired United States Air Force general who has never experienced frontline combat, he has a contentious relationship with the rebellious Francis throughout his entire stay at the academy, although the two sometimes show a deep sympathy for the other's emotional scarring from family. He wears an eye patch and has a hook for a hand, although it is never fully explained why. Before Francis leaves Marlin Academy, Spangler tells Francis that bullying him rejuvenated him and he would have retired without him, then gives him a ceremonial sword as thanks, which Francis accidentally cuts off Spangler's remaining hand with. Later in the third season, Spangler tracks Francis to Alaska, having been fired and sued for drinking on the job, and feeling depressed with no one to turn to. Francis gets him a job at the Snow Haven Retirement Home, where he has free rein to bully the elderly.
Cadet Eric Hansen, played by Eric Nenninger (28 episodes), one of Francis' friends and classmates from Marlin Academy. Francis accompanies Eric in his plan to abandon the academy to find well-paying labor work in Alaska. At the end of season three, Eric is seen for the final time being left by Francis to hitchhike home.
Cadet Drew Horton, played by Drew Powell (11 episodes) is physically the strongest cadet at Marlin Academy, but is emotionally weak.
Cadet Stanley Winn, played by Karim Prince (8 episodes) is Francis' friend and informal bodyguard during the first season.
Cadet Ken Finley, played by Arjay Smith (9 episodes) is a friend of Francis during seasons 1 and 2. He is reputed to have good grades and was hazed once from a cult group.
Cadet Joe, played by Kasan Butcher (12 episodes) is another cadet who threatens Francis in one episode.

Alaska 
Lavernia, played by Brenda Wehle (10 episodes), is Francis and Eric's malevolent boss who owns the logging site in Alaska. She has a debt book and presumably knows every dark secret about her workers. Lavernia develops a personal grudge towards Piama after she blackmails her to be nice to Francis by holding her pet parakeet hostage. Lavernia is known to hate sex toys in her lodging and which Francis is aware of.
Pete, played by Sandy Ward (11 episodes) is a possibly insane, senile elderly coworker of Francis at the Alaskan lodge.
Artie, played by John Ennis (9 episodes) – is an overweight, uneducated, color blind, and dyslexic coworker of Francis at the Alaskan lodge.

The Grotto 
Otto Mankusser, played by Kenneth Mars (25 episodes), is Francis' friendly and cheerful boss at the dude ranch, albeit a bit naïve at times. Originally from Germany, he and his wife Gretchen (Meagen Fay) own the ranch, which is known as the Grotto, a combination of their first names.

Other classmates and faculty 
Richie, played by Todd Giebenhain (6 episodes), is Francis' dim-witted best friend before being sent to military school.
Circus and Justin, played by Parker Mills and Justin Pierce (2 episodes), are Francis' hoodlum friends.
Julie Houlerman, played by Landry Allbright (3 episodes) is a girl whom Malcolm has a short-lived crush on in the first season.
Alison, played by Brittany Renee Finamore (5 episodes) is Reese's girlfriend during season 4. She originally dated Malcolm, but broke up with him.
Nikki, played by Reagan Dale Neis (4 episodes) is Malcolm's girlfriend during season 4.
Ira Prescott, played by Jonny Acker (3 episodes), is a student of North High School. He is Billy's older brother and Reese's bully. Ira debuts in "Forbidden Girlfriend" in which he owns a car which Reese ruins by using Dewey in pouring cement in it and letting Billy take the blame for the prank. With Dewey's help, Ira gets his revenge on Reese for his prank and using Billy by simply beating him up. He returns briefly in Season 5's "Malcolm Films Reese" and is among the students in humiliation and in "Reese's Apartment" when Malcolm is tutoring Ira and help get him a passing grade in his classes so he can keep his spot on the North High School football team. Unlike Reese, Ira has more respect for Malcolm.
Chad, played by Cameron Monaghan (6 episodes) is a student in Dewey's special class. He is prominently featured in the episode "Chad's Sleepover".
David Hanson, played by Danny McCarty Jr. (5 episodes) is a student in Dewey's special class. He runs for class president with a colorful campaign speech.
Zoe Desenea, played by Amy Bruckner (4 episodes) is a student in Dewey's special class. 
Mr. Hodges, played by Steve Vinovich (3 episodes in season 7) is Malcolm & Reese's school principal during their senior year.
Barton, played by Will Stebile (episode 9 in season 3) is the only classmate introduced who is smarter than Malcolm.

Guest Stars

Girl Versions of the Boys 
Mallory, played by Lisa Foiles (episode 10 in season 4)
Renee, played by Mimi Paley (episode 10 in season 4) 
Daisy, played by Jennette McCurdy (episode 10 in season 4)

References 

Lists of American sitcom television characters
Characters